Sohbatabad (also Romanized as Şoḩbatābād; also known as Şeḩḩatābād) is a village in Mirbag-e Shomali Rural District, in the Central District of Delfan County, Lorestan Province, Iran. At the 2006 census, its population was 110, in 20 families.

References 

Towns and villages in Delfan County